The Orontid dynasty, also known as the Eruandids or Eruandunis, ruled the Satrapy of Armenia until 330 BC and the Kingdom of Armenia from 321 BC to 200 BC. The Orontids ruled first as client kings or satraps of the Achaemenid Empire and after the collapse of the Achaemenid Empire established an independent kingdom. Later, a branch of the Orontids ruled as kings of Sophene and Commagene. They are the first of the three royal dynasties that successively ruled the antiquity-era Kingdom of Armenia (321 BC–428 AD).

Historical background

Some historians state that the Orontids were of Iranian origin, and suggest that it held dynastic familial linkages to the ruling Achaemenid dynasty. Throughout their existence, the Orontids stressed their lineage from the Achaemenids in order to strengthen their political legitimacy.

Other historians state the Orontids were of Armenian origin, while according to Razmik Panossian, the Orontids probably had marriage links to the rulers of Persia and other leading noble houses in Armenia, and states their Armenian ethnicity is uncertain.

The name Orontes is the Hellenized form of a masculine name of Iranian origin, rendered Eruand (Երուանդ) in Old Armenian (Yervand in Modern Armenian). The name is only attested in Greek (Gr.:Ὀρόντης). Its Avestan connection is Auruuant (brave, hero) and Middle Persian Arwand (Modern Persian اروند Arvand). Various Greek transcriptions of the name in Classical sources are spelled as Orontes, Aruandes or Ardoates. The presence of this dynasty is attested from at least 400 BC, and it can be shown to have ruled originally from Armavir and subsequently Eruandashat. Armavir is called the "first capital of the Orontid dynasty".

The precise date of the foundation of the Orontid dynasty is debated by scholars to this day but there is a consensus that it occurred after the destruction of Urartu by the Scythians and the Medes around 612 BC.

Language 
Despite the Hellenistic invasion of Persia, Persian and local Armenian culture remained the strongest element within society and the elites.

The imperial administration used Aramaic, where it was used in official documents for centuries. Whereas most inscriptions used Old Persian cuneiform. Xenophon used an interpreter to speak to Armenians, while some Armenian villages were conversant in Persian.

The Greek inscriptions at Armavir indicate that the upper classes used Greek as one of their languages. Under Ervand the Last (r. ca. 210–200 B.C.), the structure of government had begun to resemble Greek institutions, and Greek was used as the language of the royal court. Ervand had surrounded himself by the Hellenized nobility and sponsored the establishment of a Greek school in Armavir, the capital of the Ervanduni kingdom.

Orontid Kings and satraps of Armenia

Xenophon mentions an Armenian king named Tigranes in his Cyropaedia. He was an ally of Cyrus the Great with whom he hunted. Tigranes paid tribute to Astyages. His elder son was also named Tigranes. Upon the outbreak of hostilities between the Medes and Babylonians, Tigranes had renounced his treaty obligations to the Medes.

As a successor of Astyages, Cyrus demanded to be paid the same tribute. Strabo corroborates this in his Geography (xi.13.5). In 521 BC, with the disturbances that occurred after the death of Cambyses and the proclamation of Smerdis as King, the Armenians revolted. Darius I of Persia sent an Armenian named Dâdarši to suffocate the revolt, later substituting him for the Persian Vaumisa who defeated the Armenians on May 20, 521 BC. Around the same time, another Armenian by the name of Arakha, son of Haldita, claimed to be the son of the last king of Babylon, Nabonidus, and renamed himself Nebuchadnezzar IV. His rebellion was short-lived and was suppressed by Intaphrenes, Darius' bow carrier.

These events are described in detail within the Behistun inscription. After the administrative reorganization of the Persian Empire, Armenia was converted into several satrapies. Armenian satraps regularly intermarried with the family of the King of Kings. These satraps provided contingents to Xerxes' invasion of Greece in 480 BC. Herodotus says that the Armenians in the army of Xerxes "were armed like the Phrygians." In 401 BC Xenophon marched through Armenia with a large army of Greek mercenaries as part of the March of the Ten Thousand. Xenophon mentions two individuals by the name Orontes, apparently both Persian. One was a nobleman and military officer of high rank, belonging to the royal family; as the commander of the citadel of Sardis, he waged war against Cyrus the Younger and he tried to betray him to Artaxerxes II Memnon shortly before the battle of Cunaxa, but was taken prisoner and sentenced to death by a court martial. Xenophon's Anabasis has a detailed description of the country, where it is also written that the region near the river Centrites was defended by the satrap of Armenia for Artaxerxes II, named Orontes, son of Artasyras, who had Armenian contingents as well as Alarodians. Tiribaz is mentioned as hipparchos (vice-governor) of Armenia under Orontes, who later became satrap of Lydia.

In 401 BC Artaxerxes gave him his daughter Rhodogoune in marriage. In two inscriptions of king Antiochus I of Commagene on his monument at Nemrut, an Orontes, called Aroandes (son of Artasouras and husband of Artaxerxes's daughter Rhodogoune), is reckoned, among others, as an ancestor of the Orontids ruling over Commagene, who traced back their family to Darius I. Diodorus Siculus mentions another Orontes, possibly the same, that in 362 BC was satrap of Mysia and was the leader of the Satrap Revolt in Asia Minor, for which position he was well-suited because of his noble birth and his hatred of the king. Misled by his love of power and fraud, he betrayed his fellow satraps to the king. But he revolted a second time, probably owing to his dissatisfaction with the king's rewards, and launched several attacks, which were continued in the reign of the new king Artaxerxes III Ochus. During that time he also conquered and occupied the town of Pergamum, but finally he must have become reconciled with the king. In 349 he was honored by a decree of the Athenians with civic rights and a golden wreath. Many coins were struck by him during the Satraps' Revolt in Clazomenae, Phocaea, and Lampsacus. All subsequent Orontids are his descendants. Darius III was the satrap of Armenia following Orontes, from 344 to 336 BC. An Armenian contingent was present at the Battle of Gaugamela under the command of Orontes and a certain Mithraustes. Diodorus mentions that Orontes was a friend of the Macedonian general Peucestas. Armenia formally passed to the Macedonian Empire, as its rulers submitted to Alexander the Great. Alexander appointed an Orontid named Mithranes to govern Armenia following the defeat of Orontes II. With the agreement at Babylon after Alexander's death (323 BC) Armenia was assigned to Neoptolemus, and kept it till his death in battle in 321 BC. Around 302 BC the capital was transferred from Armavir to Yervandashat by Orontes.

Starting from 301 BC Armenia is included within the sphere of influence of the Seleucid Empire, but it maintained a considerable degree of autonomy, retaining its native rulers. According to Polyaenus, in 227 BC the Seleucid rebel king Antiochus Hierax took refuge in Armenian territory governed by King Arsames, founder of the city Arsamosata. Towards the end of 212 BC the country was divided into two kingdoms, both vassal states of the Seleucids: Greater Armenia and Armenia Sophene, including Commagene or Armenia Minor. Antiochus III the Great decided to suppress the local dynasties, and besieged Arsamosata. Xerxes, the satrap of Sophene and Commagene, surrendered and implored the clemency of the king, whom he accepted as his sovereign. Antiochus gave his sister Antiochis as a wife to Xerxes; she would later murder him. Greater Armenia was ruled by an Orontid descendant of Hydarnes, the last Orontid ruler of Greater Armenia (Strabo xi.14.15); he was apparently subdued by Antiochus III the Great, who then divided the land between his generals Artaxias (Artashes) and Zariadres (Zareh), both of whom would claim descent from the Orontid family.

Orontids of Commagene

In Nemrut Dagi, opposite the statues of Gods there are a long row of pedestals, on which stood the steles of the Greek ancestors of Antiochos. At a right angle to this row stood another row of steles, depicting his Orontid and Achaemenid ancestors. From these steles the ones of Darius and Xerxes are well preserved. In front of each stele is a small altar. Inscriptions have been found on two of those altars. Antiochos expended great effort to ensure that everyone was aware that he was related to the dynasty of the King of Kings, Darius I, by the marriage of princess Rhodogune to his ancestor Orontes. The father of Rhodogune was the Persian king, Artaxerxes. In 401 BC Artaxerxes defeated his younger brother, who tried to depose him. Because of the help Artaxerxes received from Orontes—his military commander and satrap of Armenia—he gave his daughter in marriage to him. Their descendant, the Orontid Mithridates I Callinicus married Seleucid Princess Laodice VII Thea.

Dynasty 
Family tree of the Orontid dynasty according to Cyril Toumanoff:

Orontid Kings in Armenian tradition
Orontes I Sakavakyats (570–560 BC)
Tigranes Orontid (560–535 BC)
Vahagn (530–515 BC)
Hidarnes I (late 6th century BC)
Hidarnes II (early 5th century BC)
Hidarnes III (middle of 5th century BC)
Artasyrus (2nd half of 5th century BC)

Kings and Satraps
Orontes (401–344 BC)
Darius Codomannus (344–336 BC)
(Note: Some dates are approximate or doubtful).
 Orontes II (336–331 BC)
 Mithranes (331–323 BC)
 Perdiccas (non-dynastic) (323 BC)
 Neoptolemus (non-dynastic) (323–321 BC)
 Eumenes (non-dynastic) (321 BC)
 Mihran (321–317 BC)
 Orontes III (317–260 BC)
 Sames of Sophene (Armenia and Sophene c. 260 BC, unknown previous tenure as Satrap of Sophene)
 Arsames I (260–228 BC) (Armenia, Sophene, and Commagene)
 Charaspes (doubtful)
 Arsames II (Sophene c. 230 BC, possibly same person as Arsames I)
 Xerxes (228–212 BC) (Sophene and Commagene)
 Abdissares (212–200 BC) (Sophene and Commagene)
 Orontes IV (228–200 BC) (Armenia)
 Ptolemaeus (201 BC–163 BC) (Commagene)
 Seleucid rule (200–189 BC)
 Artaxiad rule (189–163 BC)

Orontid Kings of Commagene
Ptolemaeus 163–130 BC
Sames II Theosebes Dikaios 130–109 BC
Mithridates I Callinicus 109–70 BC
Antiochus I Theos 70–38 BC
Mithridates II 38–20 BC
Mithridates III 20–12 BC
Antiochus III 12 BC–17 AD
Ruled by Rome 17–38 AD
Antiochus IV 38–72 AD and wife, Iotapa

See also
Artaxiad dynasty
Commagene
List of rulers of Commagene

Notes

References

Sources

{{cite book|last=Toumanoff|first=Cyril|author-link=Cyril Toumanoff|title=Studies in Christian Caucasian history|url=http://rbedrosian.com/Ref/Oront/oront278.htm|year=1963|location=Washington D.C.|publisher=Georgetown University Press|pages=278 |quote="The eponym's praenomen Orontes is as Iranian as the dynasty itself.."}}

Further reading
Cyril Toumanoff. "A Note on the Orontids." Le Muséon. 72 (1959), pp. 1–36 and 73 (1960), pp. 73–106.
 Hakop Manandyan. Քննական Տեսություն Հայ Ժողովրդի Պատմության (A Critical Study of the History of the Armenian People''). vol. i. Yerevan: Haypethrat, 1944.

External links
The Yervanduni Dynasty-A. Richard Diebold Center for Indo-European Language and Culture

 
6th-century BC establishments
2nd-century BC disestablishments
Ancient royal families